Greta Morkytė (born 27 March 1999) is a Lithuanian figure skater. She is the 2019 Lithuanian national champion and the 2018 Lithuanian national bronze medalist.

Results

References 

1999 births
Living people
Lithuanian female single skaters
Sportspeople from Šiauliai